Agonopterix septicella is a moth in the family Depressariidae. It was described by Snellen in 1884. It is found in south-eastern Siberia.

References

Moths described in 1884
Agonopterix
Moths of Asia
Taxa named by Samuel Constantinus Snellen van Vollenhoven